Open Your Eyes is a 2008 short film written and directed by Susan Cohen.

Synopsis 
Struggling to come to terms with her life and husband (Eric Lange) after breast cancer, Julia (Traci Dinwiddie) gets more than she bargained for when she attends a bridal shower and finds herself locked in a bathroom with Kat (Suzy Nakamura) - the frank-talking sister of the bride-to-be (Teresa Huang).

Festivals and awards 

Awards
 American Film Institute Jean Picker Firstenberg Award for Excellence DWW 2008
 Palm Springs International ShortFest 2008 - the Alexis Award for Most Promising Student Filmmaker
 Anchorage International Film Festival 2008 - best short film
 Canada International Film Festival 2009 - best director
 Beverly Hills Shorts Festival 2009 - best drama, best film, best director, and best actress for Traci Dinwiddie
 Vail Film Festival 2009 - best student film
 WorldFest Houston International Film Festival 2009 - Platinum Remi Award for Graduate Level Student Productions
 West Chester Film Festival 2009 - best student film
 42nd Humboldt Film Festival 2009 - the Jim DeMulling Speak Out Award and honorable mention best narrative
 Santa Cruz Film Festival 2009 - Audience Award for Best Student Work
 British Film Festival Los Angeles 2009 - best student film and best actress short film for Traci Dinwiddie
 Iowa Independent Film Festival 2009 - best student film
 Action on Film International Film Festival 2009 - best actress short film for Traci Dinwiddie
 Mexico International Film Festival 2009 - Golden Palm Winner - student film

Nominations
 Milan International Film Festival 2009 - best short film
 Method Fest Independent Film Festival 2009 - best actress short film for Traci Dinwiddie
 British Film Festival Los Angeles 2009 - best supporting actress short film for Suzy Nakamura
 Little Rock Film Festival 2009 - best short film
 Action on Film International Film Festival 2009 - best supporting actress short film for Suzy Nakamura and best female filmmaker short film category for Susan Cohen

Selected festival screenings
 40th Nashville Film Festival - April, 2009
 Little Rock Film Festival - May, 2009

External links 
 IMDb profile for Susan Cohen

Notes 

2008 films
2008 drama films
American short films
2000s English-language films